Wasiq Qayyum Abbasi (born 24 June 1987) is a Pakistani politician who currently serves as the Deputy Speaker of the Provincial Assembly of Punjab from July 2022, and the youngest person to hold this role. He had been a member of the Provincial Assembly of the Punjab from August 2018 till January 2023.

Political career

He was elected to the Provincial Assembly of the Punjab as a candidate of Pakistan Tehreek-e-Insaf from Constituency PP-12 (Rawalpindi-VII) in 2018 Pakistani general election.

He was elected unopposed as the Deputy Speaker of the Provincial Assembly on 30 July 2022, and was notified the day after. His election came after a successful vote of no confidence against his predecessor Dost Muhammad Mazari due to circumstances arising during the 2022 Pakistani constitutional crisis.

References

Living people
Punjab MPAs 2018–2023
Pakistan Tehreek-e-Insaf MPAs (Punjab)
1987 births